Wildwood is an unincorporated community in Clackamas County, Oregon, United States. It is located in the Mount Hood Corridor about 2.5 miles southeast of Brightwood, along U.S. Route 26 near the Sandy River. Wildwood, which is outside any urban growth boundary, is located in a rural area of concentrated residential development that includes both primary and vacation residences, a few commercial facilities, including a tavern, and outdoor recreational areas, including the Wildwood Recreation Site.

References

External links
Images of Wildwood from Flickr

Unincorporated communities in Clackamas County, Oregon
Unincorporated communities in Oregon